Charlotte A. Jerauld (Fillebrown; pen name, Charlotte; April 16, 1820 - August 2, 1845) was an American poet and story writer. A zealous Universalist, she contributed to Christian magazines such as Ladies' Repository, the Rose of Sharon, the Universalist Quarterly, the Miscellany, the Union, and the Star of Bethlehem. Jerauld died in 1845, age 25, after a birth, her dead infant, five days old, buried in the coffin with her.

Early life and education
Charlotte Ann Fillebrown was born in Cambridge, Massachusetts, April 16, 1820 to Richard and Charlotte near Harvard University. Charlotte was nine years old when her father died.

In early childhood, the family removed to Boston, where she was educated at the Bowdoin School and the Mayhew School. She showed an early skill for compositions. The teacher thought someone else was writing them on her behalf and she gave her a supervised test to prove it was her work. Her school was visited one day by Daniel Webster and Henry Clay. The teacher read some of the compositions and the gentlemen requested that the writer of one be pointed out to them. It proved to be Jerauld; both gentlemen complimented her, and Clay said, "I wish you were a boy; I would make a statesman of you."

Career
At the age of 15 years, she was compelled to support herself, and her preference was to go where she could have something to do with books, and consequently she entered a book-bindery, and it proved to be the place where the Ladies' Repository was bound, and owing to this fact, perhaps, her first essay for publication was sent to that periodical.

In 1841, Jerauld published her first prose. Previous to this, she had published some poetry, but this was the real beginning of her literary life. It was entitled "Emma Beaumont," and exalted the spirit of self-sacrifice in the daughter. Her pictures of life and character were always drawn from the world. With her second story, "Margaret Leslie," came a note, stating that the enclosed story was founded on facts, the heroine having been personally known to her. Of it, Edgarton said it, "almost cheated her into the belief that the plot was real, which is a proof of no ordinary skill." Her contributions to the Repository became now quite frequent, — every issue presented something written by Jerauld. This developed into a new existence for her. 

In 1842, she passed a week in Lowell, with Edgarton, at the home of Thomas Baldwin Thayer, and here she enjoyed her First Communion. In the winter of 1842, she attended a course of lectures delivered by Richard Henry Dana Sr., on "Woman", Macbeth, Shakespeare in the supernatural, and Hamlet. These quickened her perceptions of literature, and sent her to reading Shakespeare, Spenser and Milton. On November 19, 1843, she married J. W. Jerauld, and subsequently she divided her time between domestic duties and literary pursuits, producing most of the stories, sketches and poems found in the volume Poetry and Prose, by Mrs. Charlotte A. Jerauld, with a memoir by Henry Bacon, Boston. A. Tompkins, 88 Cornhill, 1860, which first appeared in the Repository and Rose of Sharon.

Much of the development of her genius was due to the influence of Rev. Henry Bacon. Jerauld's friends included Sarah Carter Edgarton Mayo and Mary Hall Barrett Adams. A singular instance of unity of thought between Jerauld and Mayo led to the best expression of their similarity of poetic feeling and religious tone. It was given in the series of Sonnets on the Lord's Prayer, written by them. Each had written a sonnet on a portion of the prayer, unknown to the other, with the intention of composing a series; and when published, the suggestion came from Mayo that they should write on alternate portions of that prayer, and thus mutually form a series of sonnets. They completed the work in 1844.

Personal life and death
On the last week of July, 1845, her child was born; on the third day after, her mind wandered, her thoughts were disconnected and confused. In a few hours, she began suffering from a raving mania. Her child died August 1, and Charlotte died on August 2nd. Jeralud and her infant were buried together in the same coffin.

References

Attribution

Bibliography

External links
 

1820 births
1845 deaths
19th-century American poets
19th-century American short story writers
19th-century American women writers
People from Cambridge, Massachusetts
Writers from Massachusetts
Members of the Universalist Church of America
American women poets
American women short story writers